Blackout: Tomorrow Will Be Too Late is a disaster thriller book by the Austrian author Marc Elsberg,  described by Penguin Books as "a 21st-century high-concept disaster thriller".

Published in German in 2012,  it had been translated into fifteen languages and sold a million copies worldwide. The English version was published in 2017.

The novel is about a European power outage due to a cyberattack. For realism the book is written on the basis of interviews with intelligence and computer security officials.

Plot

The novel starts with a collapse of electrical grids across Europe, plunging the population into darkness and disaster. The prolonged electricity cut causes major problems: no more petrol, no telephone, no food in supermarkets, no cash machines working, nuclear disasters, etc. A former computer hacker and IT professional tries to find out the root cause for this. While doing so he himself becomes a hunted person as officials find suspicious e-mails sent from his laptop and think that he is involved.

Film adaptation 

The novel is currently being adapted into a miniseries starring Moritz Bleibtreu, directed by Oliver Rihs and Lancelot von Naso and is scheduled to begin filming in fall 2020.

See also 
 Societal collapse
 Cyberwarfare

References

External links 
 Official website
 Blackout (Marc Elsberg at TEDxBerlin)

2012 novels
2012 science fiction novels
21st-century Austrian novels
Austrian speculative fiction novels
Techno-thriller novels
Novels about terrorism
Malware in fiction
Power outages
German-language novels